is a female fashion model from Tokyo, Japan. She belongs to the show-business production Burning Production, K.K. (株式会社バーニングプロダクション) and used to belong to Platica Inc.

Biography 
In 2002, Kobayashi debuted as an exclusive model of Loveberry, a fashion magazine for Japanese low-teen girls and published by Tokuma Shoten. She modeled for the magazine until 2005. In the next year, Kobayashi transferred to Face Network Co., Ltd. (株式会社フェイスネットワーク) and also debuted as a gravure idol. Then, in 2007, she took part in a model audition for the Kobe Collection, or simply, Kou-Kore. Kobayashi became a finalist but without any prize.  Also in the same year, Kobayashi joined Miss Magazine (ミスマガジン) and became a semi-finalist, from which she solely won the GyaO Prize. Soon afterwards, on July 31, she renamed her family name from Kobayashi to Uno, which derives from the president and CEO of USEN Corporation, Yasuhide Uno (宇野康秀). On April 1, 2008, Platica Inc. was independent from Face Network Co., Ltd., subsequently Kobayashi got to belong to Platica Inc. and she renamed her family name again back to Kobayashi. In 2008, Kobayashi participated in a model audition of the Kobe Collection and became a finalist again; however, she did not obtain any prize. Also in Princess PINKY Audition (プリンセスPINKYオーディション) of a fashion magazine PINKY, she became a finalist but received no prize.  In late 2008, Kobayashi was elected as the 23rd Asahi Beer Image Girl, on which she served until December 2009. Thereafter, on April 1, 2010, Kobayashi transferred to Burning Production, K.K.

She has attended the Tokyo Girls Collection twice as a model; i.e. 11th Tokyo Girls Collection of 2010 Autumn/Winter and 13th Tokyo Girls Collection of 2011 A/W.

Bibliography

Magazines 
 Loveberry, Tokuma Shoten 2001–, as an exclusive model from 2002 to 2005
 Scholar, Scholar Magazine 2008
 Weekly Playboy No.22, pp. 24–27, Shueisha 2010
 Weekly Young Jump No.49, pp. 439–443, Shueisha 2010
 Weekly Playboy No.47, pp. 95–111, Shueisha 2010
 Weekly Playboy No.7, p. 1 (cover) and pp. 5–12, Shueisha 2011
 Weekly Young Jump No.11, p. 1 (cover) and pp. 3–8, Shueisha 2011
 Weekly Young Jump No.26, pp. 431–435, Shueisha 2011

Filmography

TV drama 
 Misaki Number One!! (美咲ナンバーワン!!), Nippon Television 2011
 Shima-shima (シマシマ), TBS 2011

DVDs 
 Angel Kiss – Angel's Smile - (Angel Kiss ～天使の微笑み～), E-net Frontier 2006
 Yumi Toiro (優美十色), GP Museum Soft 2007
 Angel Kiss – Angel's Reunion - (Angel Kiss ～天使の再会～), Trico 2008

References

External links 
 Official agency profile 
 Official blog 
 Miss Magazine 2007 Semi-final 

1988 births
Living people
People from Tokyo
Japanese female models
Japanese gravure idols
Japanese actresses
Models from Tokyo Metropolis